Steven R. Rogel is the former chairman, president and chief executive officer of The Weyerhaeuser Company. Rogel has been a member of the company's board of directors since December 1, 1997, and was elected chairman and CEO on April 20, 1999. He has served as chairman in a non-executive capacity since Daniel Fulton became president and CEO in May 2008.

A University of Washington graduate, he received his Bachelor of Science degree in chemical engineering in 1965. He has also completed executive education programs at the Tuck School of Business and the MIT Sloan School of Management.

He was president and chief executive officer of Willamette Industries until 1996, when he joined Weyerhaeuser; the company later bought out Willamette in a hostile takeover in 2002.

Steven Rogel is a member of the National Executive Board of the Boy Scouts of America, the organization's governing body.

References

Tuck School of Business alumni
Living people
MIT Sloan School of Management alumni
University of Washington College of Engineering alumni
Weyerhaeuser
Year of birth missing (living people)
National Executive Board of the Boy Scouts of America members
American chief executives